The Association of Community Organizations for Reform Now (ACORN) is an international collection of autonomous community-based organizations that advocated for low- and moderate-income families by working. The association was founded in 1970 by Wade Rathke and Gary Delgado, and, at its peak in the US, had over 500,000 members and more than 1,200 neighborhood chapters in over 100 cities.

	
In the US, ACORN suffered a damaging nationwide controversy in the fall of 2009 after James O'Keefe and Hannah Giles secretly recorded, and released videos of interactions with low-level ACORN personnel in several of their offices. In the videos, James poses as a pimp attempting to start a brothel with underage immigrant girls from Central America. ACORN personnel attempt to help James with housing his brothel. Multiple investigations were conducted and found that the released tapes were selectively edited to portray ACORN as negatively as possible, and found James O'Keefe's recordings violated privacy laws in Maryland and California. The organization conducted its own audits and cooperated with investigations of employees, referring some cases to law enforcement. Not one of the cases were forward to a judge. In the meantime, however, the organization suffered an immediate loss of funding from government agencies with which it had contracts and from private donors.

The loss of funds had been too damaging, and by March 2010, 15 of ACORN's 30 state chapters had already closed.  ACORN announced it was closing its remaining state chapters and disbanding.  On November 2, 2010, its U.S. offices filed for Chapter 7 liquidation effectively closing the organization. ACORN members and organizers formed new organizations in at least three states while ACORN groups outside of the US continued unaffected. ACORN, under ACORN International, still works within the US through its Home Savers Campaign, for example.

Organization and budget 
In the US, ACORN was composed of a number of legally distinct nonprofit entities and affiliates including a nationwide umbrella organization established as a 501(c)(4) that performed lobbying; local chapters established as 501(c)(3) nonpartisan charities; and the national nonprofit and nonstock organization, ACORN Housing Corporation. ACORN's priorities included: better housing and wages for the poor, more community development investment from banks and governments, better public schools, labor-oriented causes and social justice issues. ACORN pursued these goals through demonstration, negotiation, lobbying for legislation, and voter participation.

Until the controversies of 2008 and 2009, in the US ACORN had an annual budget of approximately US$25 million, with approximately 10% of those funds coming from federal sources, a smaller figure from state sources, and the rest coming from supporters and membership.  HUD estimated that ACORN received $42 million in federal funds since the 2000 budget year; the House Oversight and Government Reform Committee estimated that ACORN received $53 million since 1994.

History

1970–1975
ACORN was founded by Wade Rathke, Gary Delgado, and George Wiley in 1970. Rathke had previously dropped out of Williams College to promote draft resistance for Students for a Democratic Society. ACORN's first campaign was to help welfare recipients attain their basic needs, such as clothing and furniture. This drive, inspired by a clause in the Arkansas welfare laws, began their effort to create and sustain a movement to assist welfare and lower-income working individuals; they developed the Arkansas Community Organizations for Reform Now, the beginnings of ACORN.

ACORN's goal was to "unite welfare recipients with needy working people around issues such as school lunches, unemployment, Vietnam veterans' rights, and emergency room care."

1975–1980
In 1975, ACORN created branches in Texas and South Dakota. On December 13, 1975, sixty leaders from the three ACORN states elected the first associate Executive Board and the first ACORN president, Steve McDonald, to deal with matters beyond the scope of the individual city and state boards. Each year thereafter ACORN chapters were established in three or more states, building to a total of 20 states represented by 1980. This expansion led to multi-state campaigns, beginning with a mass meeting of 1,000 members in Memphis in 1978. At the end of the conference, ACORN convention delegates marched on the Democratic Party conference with the outline of a nine-point "People's Platform." When ratified in 1979, this became the foundation of ACORN's platform.

ACORN was active in the 1980 Election with the "People's Platform" serving as its standard. It led demonstrations aimed at both major party candidates; demanded to meet with President Jimmy Carter; marched on the president's campaign finance committee chair's home; and presented its platform to the Republican Party platform committee.

1981–1989
By 1980, ACORN's staff was stretched thin by the demands of meeting its expansion goals. Much of its resources and energy had been dedicated to the presidential primaries and national party conventions. ACORN launched squatting campaigns in an attempt to obtain affordable housing, and encouraged squatters to refit the premises for comfortable living.

In June 1982, ACORN sponsored "Reagan Ranches" in Washington, DC and more than 35 other cities, in reaction to its belief that the president was focused on military as opposed to social spending. These tent cities were erected for two days on national park grounds; they were resisted by the National Park Service, which tried repeatedly to evict the tenters. The protesters remained; they marched on the White House and members testified before a Congressional committee about what they described as the housing crisis in America. The last Reagan Ranch was held at the Republican Convention in Dallas in 1984. 

In addition to protesting, ACORN also developed and strengthened its political action committees and encouraged its members to run for office. For the 1984 election ACORN wanted to endorse a candidate, setting a 75% support in polls among members as its requirement. No candidate reached that level, though there was strong support for Jesse Jackson. ACORN also established a legislative office that year in Washington, DC. During this period ACORN also focused on local election reform in a number of cities, including Pittsburgh, Columbia, South Carolina, and Sioux Falls, South Dakota. They encouraged cities to change legislative bodies whose members were elected at-large to electing members by single-member district, which resulted in more participation by minorities, including women. At-large voting tends to favor candidates who can appeal to the majority and who can command more campaign funding, reducing participation by a wider variety of citizens.

By the end of Reagan's first term, ACORN operated in 27 states, adding chapters in New York City, Washington, DC, and Chicago. During the 1988 Election, ACORN held its National Convention in the same city as the Democratic Convention — Atlanta.

ACORN's membership grew to more than 70,000 in 28 states during this time. It increased its legislative lobbying efforts in Washington, DC, and strengthened its Political Action Committees (PACs). It also developed what it called the Affiliated Media Foundation Movement (AM/FM). Starting with station KNON in Dallas, AM/FM established radio stations, UHF television and cable television programming. It also sought and received appointments to the Resolution Trust Corporation (RTC), which was formed to dissolve the assets of failed Savings and Loans resulting from the Savings and Loan crisis.

1988–1998

While some of ACORN's most notable efforts were in the area of housing, it has counted health, public safety, education, representation, work and workers' rights and communications concerns among its victories.  The 1990 ACORN convention in Chicago focused on the fast-breaking housing campaign.  It featured a squatting demonstration at an RTC house.  ACORN members demanded that banks provide loan data on low- and moderate-income communities and comply with the 1977 Community Reinvestment Act (CRA).  ACORN fought weakening of the CRA in 1991, staging a two-day takeover of the House Banking Committee hearing room.  It established ACORN Housing Corporation to assist people in moving into homes under the housing campaign, and to rehabilitate hundreds of houses addressed by the CRA.  The ACORN convention in New York in 1992, called the "ACORN-Bank Summit", was organized to make deals with giant banks.  When Citibank, the nation's largest bank, did not participate, conventioneers protested at its downtown Manhattan headquarters, and won a meeting to negotiate for similar programs.  

ACORN supported and lobbied for the "Motor Voter" Act, which provided for voter registration at motor vehicle bureaus.  After its passage, ACORN members attended President Clinton's signing ceremony.  ACORN worked for new voter registration laws in Arkansas and Massachusetts and filed suit in Illinois, Louisiana, Michigan, Missouri, New Jersey, and Pennsylvania against certain state practices as a result of the act.

In 1993, ACORN also began a national campaign to fight insurance redlining, a practice that put the gains made in other housing campaigns at risk.  The campaign targeted Allstate, hitting sales offices in 14 cities and a stockholders meeting.   Allstate agreed to negotiate and signed an agreement in 1994 for a $10 million partnership with ACORN and NationsBank for below-market mortgages to low-income home-buyers.  Travelers Insurance agreed to a Neighborhood and Home Safety Program, linking access to insurance and lower rates to public safety programs.

1998–2004
ACORN has worked on supporting a "Living Wage" programs, voter registration, and grassroots political organization.

In 1998, ACORN helped form the Working Families Party in New York, which had made increasing the minimum wage as its centerpiece issue.

A March 27, 2003 decision of the National Labor Relations Board found that ACORN tried to thwart union organizing efforts within its own organization by laying off two workers who were trying to organize. The two workers, both field organizers with ACORN, began discussions with the Service Employees International Union and later sought to organize under Industrial Workers of the World, seeking to improve their $20,200 annual salary for a 54-hour work week. The NLRB ordered the two employees be reinstated in their former jobs and that ACORN cease from interrogating employees about organizing activity.

ACORN International was created in 2004 as an offshoot of ACORN to aid the spread of ACORN's model to other countries.

2008–2009

Accusations of voter fraud 
ACORN is a liberal organization, and in the US its legally separate political action arm frequently endorsed causes and candidates, including the 2008 Democratic presidential nominee Barack Obama. ACORN lobbied every Democratic National Convention since 1980 and had members elected as delegates to those conventions; ACORN also lobbied at Republican conventions. ACORN was criticized by Republicans for its support of Democratic candidates and for its general support of political positions that are more often favored by Democrats.

In a report released in October 2008, the U.S. Department of Justice Inspector General concluded that U.S. Attorney General Alberto Gonzales fired U.S. Attorney David Iglesias (one of nine US attorneys removed in 2006) for political reasons after Iglesias failed to prosecute a New Mexico ACORN chapter. The report said claims that Iglesias was fired for poor performance were not credible, and the "real reason for Iglesias's removal was the complaints from New Mexico Republican politicians and party activists about how Iglesias handled voter fraud [cases]." Iglesias did not believe there was sufficient evidence to support prosecution by the government.

During the debate on the Emergency Economic Stabilization Act of 2008, some commentators claimed that a draft provision (omitted in the adopted bill) to give money to funds run by the U.S. Department of the Treasury could potentially lead to money going to groups like ACORN. When asked how much money ACORN or other community groups would get, a spokesman for Financial Services Committee chairman Barney Frank, said, "Absolutely none. All funds would go to state and local governments." Critics also claimed that ACORN's complex organizational structure allowed it to escape public scrutiny.

ACORN was among groups conducting voter registration drives prior to the 2008 presidential election; it was alleged they were responsible for voter registration fraud and had a conflict of interest. During the 2008 Democratic Presidential Primary, ACORN's national political action committee, ACORN Votes, endorsed Barack Obama. Obama, with several other attorneys, had served as local counsel for ACORN more than a decade earlier in a 1995 voting rights lawsuit joined by the Justice Department and the League of Women Voters. Obama's campaign hired an ACORN affiliate for $800,000 to conduct a get-out-the-vote effort during that primary, but did not retain ACORN for the general presidential election.

Throughout the election season, supporters of Republican candidates alleged that ACORN was responsible for widespread vote fraud. In October 2008, the campaign for Republican presidential candidate John McCain released a Web-based advertisement claiming ACORN was responsible for "massive voter fraud," a point that Sen. McCain repeated in the final presidential debate. FactCheck.org called this claim "breathtakingly inaccurate," but acknowledged that ACORN had problems with phony registrations. The ads also claimed that home loan programs ACORN promoted were partly responsible for the sub-prime mortgage crisis, claims which Newsweek and Factcheck.org also found to be exaggerated and inaccurate.

A poll released in November 2009 by Public Policy Polling found that 26% of respondents overall, believed in a conspiracy theory that ACORN "stole" the election for Barack Obama. That number increased to 56% amongst Republicans polled.  The Democratic polling organization commented that this was somewhat higher than belief in the birther conspiracy theories. (In a follow-poll in 2012, PPP found that 49% of Republicans, nearly the same percentage as in 2009, believed that ACORN had stolen the 2012 election for Obama, despite the fact that by then ACORN was no longer operating.)

Embezzlement 
The New York Times reported on July 9, 2008, that Dale Rathke, the brother of ACORN's founder Wade Rathke, was found to have embezzled $948,607.50 from the group and affiliated charitable organizations in 1999 and 2000. ACORN executives decided to handle it as an internal matter, and did not inform most of the board members or law enforcement, and instead signed an enforceable restitution agreement with the Rathke family to repay the amount of the embezzlement. $210,000 has already been repaid, and a donor, Drummond Pike, has offered to pay the remaining debt. The Times reported that, according to Wade Rathke, "the decision to keep the matter secret was not made to protect his brother but because word of the embezzlement would have put a 'weapon' into the hands of enemies of ACORN, a liberal group that is a frequent target of conservatives who object to ACORN's often strident advocacy on behalf of low- and moderate-income families and workers." A whistleblower revealed the embezzlement in 2008. On June 2, 2008, Dale Rathke was dismissed, and Wade stepped down as ACORN's chief organizer, but he remains chief organizer for Acorn International L.L.C.

In September 2008, following revelations of Dale Rathke's embezzlement, two members of ACORN's national board of directors filed a lawsuit seeking to obtain financial documents and to force the organization to sever ties with Wade Rathke. ACORN's executive committee voted unanimously to remove the two, "because their actions—such as releasing a confidential legal memo to the press—were damaging the organization."

In October 2009, Louisiana Attorney General Buddy Caldwell claimed in a subpoena that ACORN's board of directors found that a larger amount—$5 million—had been embezzled from the organization. Bertha Lewis, ACORN's CEO, said the allegation is false. On November 6, following up on the subpoena, Caldwell served a search warrant at the ACORN headquarters in New Orleans. Caldwell stated, "This is an investigation of everything—Acorn, the national organization, the local organization and all of its affiliated entities."

Undercover videos controversy 

In September 2009, Hannah Giles and James O'Keefe publicized  hidden camera recordings through Fox News and Andrew Breitbart's website BigGovernment.  In the videos, Giles posed as a prostitute and O'Keefe posed as her boyfriend in order to elicit damaging responses from employees of ACORN. The videos were recorded over the summer of 2009 while visiting ACORN offices in eight cities, and purported to show low-level ACORN employees in several cities providing advice to Giles and O'Keefe on how to avoid taxes and detection by the authorities with regard to their plans to engage in tax evasion, human smuggling, and child prostitution.

After the videos were made public, the U.S. Congress voted to eliminate federal funding to ACORN. The House passed a bill by a 345–75 vote to stop all federal funding to ACORN. Every House Republican who attended the vote backed the measure, as well as 172 Democrats, while only 75 Democrats opposed it. The Senate, earlier had passed a bill by an 83 to 7 margin to bar ACORN from receiving federal housing grants from the Department of Housing and Urban Development.

Although the resolutions were later nullified in a federal court ruling that the measure was an unconstitutional bill of attainder, on August 13, 2010, a federal appeals court upheld the congressional act that cut off federal funding for ACORN. In March 2010, ACORN announced it would be closing its offices and disbanding due to loss of funding from government and private donors.

On December 7, 2009, the former Massachusetts Attorney General, after an independent internal investigation of ACORN, found the videos that had been released appeared to have been edited, "in some cases substantially". He found no evidence of criminal conduct by ACORN employees, but concluded that ACORN had poor management practices that contributed to unprofessional actions by a number of its low-level employees. On March 1, 2010, the District Attorney's office for Brooklyn determined that the videos were "heavily edited" and "many of the seemingly crime-encouraging answers were taken out of context so as to appear more sinister", and concluded that there was no criminal wrongdoing by the ACORN staff in the videos from the Brooklyn ACORN office.  On April 1, 2010, an investigation by the California Attorney General found the videos from Los Angeles, San Diego and San Bernardino to be "heavily edited," and the investigation did not find evidence of criminal conduct on the part of ACORN employees. On June 14, 2010, the U.S. Government Accountability Office (GAO) released its findings which showed that ACORN evidenced no sign that it, or any of its related organizations, mishandled any federal money they had received.

Defund ACORN Act 
In late 2009, after various allegations of criminal activity due to the videos, a number of Democrats who once advertised their connections to ACORN began to distance themselves.  In immediate response to the 2009 video controversy, the United States House and Senate, by wide margins, attached amendments to pending spending legislation that would temporarily prohibit the federal government from funding ACORN, or any agency that had been involved in similar scandals — including money authorized by previous legislation.  President Obama signed the bill into law on October 1.

ACORN sued the United States Government in the United States District Court in Brooklyn over the measure, known as the "Defund ACORN Act", claiming it was a bill of attainder, and therefore unconstitutional. Experts varied on the merit of the case, which was styled ACORN v. United States. One argument was that while government funding choices do not generally qualify as bills of attainder, the lack of a non-punitive regulatory purpose for the legislation may give a court "sufficient basis to overcome the presumption of constitutionality." The court issued a preliminary injunction that nullified the act.

In response to an inquiry from a Housing and Urban Development Department lawyer, David Barron, the acting assistant attorney general for the Office of Legal Counsel, wrote a five-page memorandum concluding that the law does not prohibit the government from paying ACORN for services already performed. On December 11, U.S. District Judge Nina Gershon issued a preliminary injunction blocking the government from enforcing its temporary spending ban, a week before it was set to expire. The Government Accountability Office (GAO) opened an investigation of ACORN in December 2009. In June 2010, the GAO released a preliminary report stating the investigation has found no sign the group or related organizations mishandled the $40 million in federal money they received from nine federal agencies.

On August 13, 2010 the U.S. Court of Appeals for the Second Circuit reversed Judge Gershon's decision. The appeals court cited a study finding that only 10% of ACORN's funding came from federal sources, and stated, "We doubt that the direct consequences of the appropriations laws temporarily precluding ACORN from federal funds were so disproportionately severe or so inappropriate as to constitute punishment." The Center for Constitutional Rights, which had argued the case on ACORN's behalf, was considering a request for a rehearing by more judges of the 2nd Circuit.

Dissolution
On March 19, 2010, The New York Times reported that ACORN was on the verge of filing for bankruptcy; 15 of the group's 30 state chapters had disbanded over the previous six months, and other chapters (including the largest, in New York and California) renamed themselves and severed all ties to the national organization.  Two unnamed ACORN officials told the Times that the following weekend, a teleconference was planned to discuss a bankruptcy filing; "private donations from foundations to Acorn [had] all but evaporated," and the federal government had distanced itself from the group. "[L]ong before the activist videos delivered what may become the final blow, the organization was dogged for years by financial problems and accusations of fraud." "That 20-minute video ruined 40 years of good work," said Sonja Merchant-Jones, former co-chairwoman of ACORN's recently closed Maryland chapter. "But if the organization had confronted its own internal problems, it might not have been taken down so easily."

On March 22, 2010, National ACORN spokesman Kevin Whelan says the organization's board decided to close remaining state affiliates and field offices by April 1 because of falling revenues. Other national operations continued operating for another several weeks before shutting for good. On April 20, ACORN CEO Bertha Lewis reported that ACORN was "still alive. We're limping along. We're on life support." Lewis said that ACORN's annual budget had been reduced from $25 million to $4 million, and that its staff of 350 to 600 people had been reduced to four. Lewis explained the controversies had left a stain on ACORN, "sort of like a scarlet letter," forcing the group to spend money defending itself against "one investigation after another."

ACORN-affiliated groups
After the dissolution of ACORN in the US, some chapters continued operations by setting up new organization:
Members and staff of California ACORN founded a new organization, the Alliance of Californians for Community Empowerment. 
New York ACORN founded New York Communities for Change. 
A Milwaukee offshoot of ACORN called Acorn Housing changed its name to Affordable Housing Centers of America yet has retained the same tax and employee identification numbers that it held under its former name.
The Center for Popular Democracy includes many of the old chapters of ACORN.

After ACORN International was founded, groups in other countries became affiliated, include Living Rent in Scotland and Alliance Citoyenne in France.

References

Bibliography

External links

ACORN International's US campaigns
ACORN International website
Legacy websites
ACORN USA website placeholder
The ACORN website as it appeared in 2009 (USA)

Organizations established in 1970
1970 establishments in the United States
Organizations disestablished in 2010
Civil rights organizations in the United States
Community-building organizations
Consumer rights organizations
United States political action committees
Affordable housing advocacy organizations
Gun control advocacy groups in the United States
Immigration political advocacy groups in the United States
Nonpartisan organizations in the United States
Progressive organizations in the United States
Squatting in the United States